Christ Church is a non-denominational Christian church, previously Anglican, located on Mall Road, Mhow, Madhya Pradesh, India. It was built by men of the Warwickshire and Brecknockshire regiments, the first British army units to be based in Mhow, as a garrison church, and consecrated in 1823. In addition to being a functional church, the building is a major tourist attraction for the array of Commemorative and Memorial plaques that have been installed by various units of the British Army during their tenures at Mhow.

Architecture

The church building seems to have a modified Early English Gothic Style of construction. There is a single transept at the fore of the building, while the steeple stands approximately 10 metres high to the aft, topped by a spire and belfry, wherein the bell is housed. In its final (present) form, there is a white marble altar at the East end of the building which was installed in 1881, in keeping with the reformed Protestant traditions of the time. There are two large intricate stained glass windows above the Altar at the East end, one representing Jesus on the Cross and the other depicting Jesus with His apostles.
Having been established and used as a church by members of the British Army, there are several memorial plaques installed along the inner walls of the building.

History

Establishment of the Cantonment and Church
Consequent to the signing of the Treaty of Mandsaur in 1818, between the East India Company and Malhar Rao Holkar, the British held general political and military charge in this part of Central India. A British Cantonment was planned and founded at the Southern Corner of the Malwa Plateau by Major General Sir John Malcolm GCB, KLS. While the British Resident with a strong posse of troops was housed in a building at Manpur (in the present-day Navodaya School at Manpur), overlooking the main axis leading from Pune (the seat of power of the Maratha Empire), the British Cantonment was established on a somewhat narrow ridge with an elevation of 1800 feet above MSL, at Mhow. The British Infantry Barracks were constructed at the Southern end of Mhow, the area presently being occupied by the Military College of Telecommunication Engineering (MCTE); while Christ Church was built at the Northern end. The Church was located diagonally opposite the Old Parade Ground, where the Headquarters of the Infantry School, Mhow was located up to 2014. It was referred to as the ‘Church of England’, so as to differentiate it from the ‘Church of Scotland’ & ‘Church of Ireland’ – also constructed at Mhow for the troops from those countries to worship.

Construction and Expansion
The construction of the Church happened at the same time as that of the Mhow Fort. However, the Church took two years longer – being completed and consecrated in 1823. The central portion of the Church was initially constructed with a temporary structure. The Northern and Southern wings of the building were added subsequently. The expansion was carried out by British Army units stationed at Mhow, as they felt the space inside was inadequate to accommodate the congregation. In its final state, the Church was capable of housing one Infantry Battalion. Windows were installed on the Northern and Southern wings in 1877. It was at this time that Rifle Holders were installed on the pews of the Church, as a result of the experience of the Indian Rebellion of 1857. The Church was shifted to the Prayer House of the 17th Lancers in 1878, while the canvas roof was being replaced with a wooden structure and tiles, which remain intact to this day.
The building is supported entirely by a framework of Teak, while the walls are Brickwork with Lime mortar. With the Steeple, the Church was the tallest building of Mhow at the time of construction. The marble Altar was established later, in 1881 – under the supervision of Reverend RC Mills, the then chaplain of the Church.

Installation of Pipe Organ
The Pipe organ was installed by the 2nd Battalion The Suffolk Regiment in 1936. This entailed the construction of an additional room for the billows, windchest and other equipment. The Organ has 14 pipes, arranged in ranks from either extremity. In its present form, the Organ is not functional as a result of vandalism of equipment over the years.

Period between 1947 and 1971
In 1947, the Church was rechristened Christ Church and Reverend WB Parmar, the Veterinary Doctor of the Cantonment Board, Mhow was appointed as minister. He continued till his death in 1971, which coincided with the moving out of all military personnel for the 1971 Indo Pak War. Till this time, the Church was supervised by the Right Reverend JW Sadiq, Bishop of Nagpur; while the repairs and upkeep of the building was done by the Military Engineer Services (MES).

1971 to 1992
As the military units of Mhow moved out for the 1971 War, the MES was unable to undertake maintenance of the Church. The Church witnesses considerable decay during the period between 1971 and 1992 with looting of artefacts and furniture and squatting in the compounds. The Bhopal Diocese tried to claim the Church as part of their property during this time.

1992 Onwards

In 1992, Major Samuel Paul (Retired), an old resident of Mhow returned upon retirement from the Indian Army (Regiment of Artillery and Army Intelligence Corps). The Officer formed a committee of all the former members of the Church and began the work of making the Church functional again. With the help of the Station Headquarters, Mhow, the squatters were evicted from the compound of the Church. Having attained his Masters in Divinity degree in 2004, Major Paul has been performing the duties of Minister and Honorary Parish Priest. He undertook efforts to re-confirm the Church as a Garrison Church and organised repairs of the building in 2004, paid for by contributions by members. Over the years, Infantry Battalions stationed at Mhow have contributed to the maintenance and upkeep of this heritage building and religious institution. 
Presently, the Church has multi-denominational attendance, with a significant transient membership of service personnel and their families who visit Mhow for military duties. Sunday services usually follow the pattern enunciated in the Book of Common Prayer, following the formal structure given therein.

Gallery of Commemorative Plaques
Christ Church Mhow has 50 Commemorative and Memorial plaques installed on various locations along the inner walls. These have been placed by units and persons, in memory of those who died while they were stationed at Mhow Cantonment. A few newer plaques have been installed post-Independence, in memory of prominent members of the church. These plaques serve both as a memorial and as a reliable record of the history of Mhow as a Cantonment.

References

Sources
Indore Plus, Times of India 24 April 2011: "Chronicle of Christ Church" by Deepa Vanjani
Daily Pioneer 25 Dec 2019: "Christ church catches people’s attention" by Vikas Tyagi
Photos of Christ Church

Mhow
Anglican church buildings in India
Religious buildings and structures in Madhya Pradesh
Churches in India